In mathematics, specifically in category theory, a pseudo-abelian category is a category that is preadditive and is such that every idempotent has a kernel. Recall that an idempotent morphism  is an endomorphism of an object with the property that . Elementary considerations show that every idempotent then has a cokernel. The pseudo-abelian condition is stronger than preadditivity, but it is weaker than the requirement that every morphism have a kernel and cokernel, as is true for abelian categories.

Synonyms in the literature for pseudo-abelian include pseudoabelian and Karoubian.

Examples 

Any abelian category, in particular the category Ab of abelian groups, is pseudo-abelian. Indeed, in an abelian category, every morphism has a kernel.

The category of associative rngs (not rings!) together with multiplicative morphisms is pseudo-abelian.

A more complicated example is the category of Chow motives. The construction of Chow motives uses the pseudo-abelian completion described below.

Pseudo-abelian completion 

The Karoubi envelope construction associates to an arbitrary category  a category  together with a functor

When applied to a preadditive category , the Karoubi envelope construction yields a pseudo-abelian category 
Moreover, the functor

is in fact an additive morphism.

To be precise, given a preadditive category  we construct a pseudo-abelian category  in the following way. The morphisms

The functor

Citations

References 

 

Category theory